Christopher Kas (born 13 June 1980) is a retired German tennis player.

Kas has a career-high ATP singles ranking of world No. 224, which he achieved in November 2002. He also has a career-high doubles ranking of world No. 17, achieved in February 2012.

Kas reached 20 double finals on the ATP Tour posting a record of 5 wins and 15 losses with an array of partners.

At the 2012 Summer Olympics, he finished in fourth place in mixed doubles alongside Sabine Lisicki. In January 2015, Sabine appointed him to her coaching team.

In 2022, Kas coaches German tennis player Jule Niemeier. They reached together 2022 the quarterfinals at Wimbledon.

Olympic medal matches

Mixed doubles: 1 bronze medal match (0–1)

ATP career finals

Doubles: 20 (5 titles, 15 runner-ups)

ATP Challenger and ITF Futures finals

Singles: 2 (1–1)

Doubles: 38 (28–10)

Performance timelines

Doubles

Mixed doubles

References

External links

 
 
 
 
 

1980 births
Living people
German male tennis players
German tennis coaches
People from Traunstein (district)
Sportspeople from Upper Bavaria
Tennis players at the 2012 Summer Olympics
Olympic tennis players of Germany
Tennis people from Bavaria